Udayapur may refer to:

Udayapur, Bheri, Nepal
Udayapur, Lumbini, Nepal
Udayapur district, Nepal
Udaypur, Kalna, a village in Kalna II CD Block, Kalna subdivision, Bardhaman district, West Bengal, India
Udaypur, Nayagarh, a village in Nayagarh district, Odisha, India

See also 
 Udaipur (disambiguation)